The 1903–04 Indiana Hoosiers men's basketball team represented Indiana University. Their head coach was Willis Koval, who was in his 2nd and final year. The team played its home games at the Old Assembly Hall in Bloomington, Indiana.

The Hoosiers finished the regular season with an overall record of 5–4.

Roster

Schedule

|-
!colspan=8| Regular Season
|-

References

Indiana
Indiana Hoosiers men's basketball seasons
Indiana Hoosiers
Indiana Hoosiers